Navagadh railway station  is a railway station serving in Rajkot district of Gujarat State of India. It is under Bhavnagar railway division of Western Railway Zone of Indian Railways. Passenger and Express trains halt here.

Trains 

The following trains halt at Navagadh railway station in both directions:

 22957/58 Ahmedabad - Veraval Somnath Superfast Express
 19119/20 Ahmedabad - Somnath Intercity Express
 19569/70 Rajkot - Veraval Express
 16333/34 Veraval - Thiruvananthapuram Express
 19571/52 Rajkot - Porbandar Express (Via Jetalsar)
 11087/88 Veraval - Pune Express

References

Railway stations in Rajkot district
Bhavnagar railway division